The Trial of the Pyx is a judicial ceremony in the United Kingdom to ensure that newly minted coins from the Royal Mint conform to their required dimensional and fineness specifications. Although coin quality is now tested throughout the year under laboratory conditions, the event has become an annual historic tradition. Each year, thousands of coins are put on trial, consisting of both those struck for circulation and non-circulating commemorative coins.

First held in the 12th century, the event takes place in the hall of the Worshipful Company of Goldsmiths in London, where the Deputy Master of the Mint (CEO of the Royal Mint) is in effect put on trial before a High Court judge as metallurgical assayers and selected leaders from the financial world sample coins from the mint's output. The boxes in which coins are stored form the ceremony's namesake: the word pyx derives from the Greek, πυξίς, (pyxis) meaning wooden box.

History 
According to records from the Dialogus de Scaccario, in 1179 the weight and fineness of coinage received by England's Exchequer was examined for regulatory purposes under the supervision of the Baron of the Exchequer. At this time the Master of the Mint was ordered to put aside one coin for every ten pounds of silver minted so that they might be tested every three months. Found in the Red Book of the Exchequer, a section thought to be written in May 1279 titled "forma nova monete" ("A new form of currency") set forth procedures for a regular series of trials whereby the Master of the Mint became liable for failings in the currency standards. Coins were to be put into a box with two keys, each held by the master and warden and its contents tested four times a year.

In 1282, in the reign of Edward I, a writ was issued ordering barons to carry out pyx trials throughout the realm. The current statutory basis for the Trial of the Pyx is the Coinage Act 1971, the latest in a long series of similarly named Acts of Parliament. Specific procedures are established by Order in Council, the most recent being the Trial of the Pyx Order 1998, which was amended in 2005, 2012 and 2016. It is not required for a new Order to be issued for each Trial: this is required only to implement regulatory revision.

Prior to the Coinage Act 1870 trials took place at the Palace of Westminster and coins were stored in Westminster Abbey's Pyx Chapel. The Act moved the venue for the trial to Goldsmiths' Hall, the headquarters of the Worshipful Company of Goldsmiths who carry out the testing.

Procedure 
Every year around February, the event begins with a meeting held in Goldsmiths' Hall. Attending the gathering are the Prime Warden of the Goldsmiths' Company, three of their supporting Wardens, the Head of the Assay Office, Liverymen, The Deputy Master of the Mint, the King's Remembrancer, and the High Commissioners of New Zealand. The presiding judge is the King's Remembrancer (or Queen's Remembrancer when the sitting monarch is female), the Senior Master of the King's Bench. It is his or her responsibility to ensure that the trial be held in accordance with the law and to deliver the jury's final verdict to His Majesty's Treasury. Where and when a trial is to take place is at the Treasury's discretion, though there must be a trial in any year during which the Royal Mint issues coins.

Coins to be tested are drawn from the regular production of the Royal Mint. The Deputy Master of the Mint must, throughout the year, randomly select several thousand sample coins and place them aside for the Trial. These must be in a certain fixed proportion to the number of coins produced. For example, for every 5,000 bimetallic coins issued, one must be set aside, whereas for silver Maundy money the proportion is one in 150.

The jury is composed of at least six assayers from the Company of Goldsmiths. They have two months to test the provided coins, and decide whether they have been properly minted. Criteria are given for diameter, chemical composition and weight for each class of coinage. Depending on the number of coins being assayed there are a varying number of jurors needed. Sitting along a table, the jurors are handed packets of up to 50 coins, by a Royal Mint official, which they must count. Each juror selects one coin from the pile, places it in a copper bowl and it is then sent to be assayed. The remaining coins are either sent to be weighed or weighed at the table. Smaller denomination coins that are more numerous are counted by machine.

At the company's assay office, the coins which were placed in the copper bowls are melted down and formed into plates where their fineness and weight can be compared against a corresponding trial plate which acts as a benchmark. After three months of testing, a ceremony presided over by the King's Remembrancer is held, when the final verdict is given. Attending the event and receiving the verdict under the capacity as Master of the Mint is the Chancellor of the Exchequer or his Deputy Master, the Chief Executive of the Royal Mint.

If the coinage is found to be substandard, the trial carries a punishment for the Master of the Mint of a fine, removal from office, or imprisonment. The last master of the mint to be punished was Isaac Newton in 1696.

List of trials 
Prior to the Coinage Act 1971 which ordered a trial to be held at least once a year, trials were carried out in no particular order and often covered the coinage of multiple years.

Trials

Trials – Reign of Elizabeth II 
Trials have been held in every calendar year of the reign (starting in 1952).

See also

 Halsbury's Laws of England
 United States Assay Commission, which performed a similar function in that country
The historical novel The System of the World contains a detailed scene that covers the stages of a Trial of the Pyx conducted in 1714.

References

External links 

 Royal Mint description, retrieved 23 March 2009
 Company of Goldsmiths description
 Pyx Chamber at Westminster Abbey, retrieved 23 March 2009
 Blog report by an observer of the Trial
 Report of Trial of the Pyx 2013.

UK legislation

 
 
 

Numismatics
Law of the United Kingdom
1282 establishments in England
Annual events in the United Kingdom
Trials in the United Kingdom